Anatolia, also known as Asia Minor, is the peninsular region between the Black Sea in the north and Mediterranean Sea in the south.

Anatolia may also refer to:
 Air Anatolia, a defunct Turkish airline
 Anatolia (album), a 1997 album by Mezarkabul
 Anatolia College in Merzifon, former name of the Anatolia College of Thessaloniki
 Anatolia College, private non-profit educational institution  in Thessaloniki
 Anatolia Eyalet, a former Ottoman province
 Anatolic Theme, a former Byzantine province
 Classical or Roman Anatolia, a province of ancient Rome
 Fire of Anatolia, a Turkish dance group
 Saint Anatolia, a Christian woman denounced for refusing to marry a non-Christian and martyred for her Christianity
 Eastern Anatolia Region, a region in Turkey
 Central Anatolia Region, a region in Turkey
 Southeastern Anatolia Region, a region in Turkey

See also
 Anadolu (disambiguation)
 Anatolian (disambiguation)
 Santa Anatolia (disambiguation)